Lee Wei Ling is a Singaporean neurologist. She was the director of the National Neuroscience Institute.

Career
Lee received a President's Scholarship in 1973, before studying in the medical faculty of the University of Singapore (now the National University of Singapore), where she graduated top of her class with a Bachelor of Medicine and Bachelor of Surgery degree before specialising in paediatrics. 

She began working in the paediatric ward at the Singapore General Hospital (SGH) and received board certification from the American Board of Clinical Neuropsychology.

Personal life
Lee is the daughter of Lee Kuan Yew, the first prime minister of Singapore. She is also the younger sister of Lee Hsien Loong, the incumbent prime minister of Singapore, and the older sister of Lee Hsien Yang, a businessman.

In August 2020, Lee stated she had been diagnosed with progressive supranuclear palsy, a rare brain disorder that results in the weakening of certain muscles.

Administrator of Lee Kuan Yew's will
Lee and her brother, Lee Hsien Yang, are the joint administrators and executors of Lee Kuan Yew's will. However, they were in a dispute in 2017 with Lee Hsien Loong over their late father's will with regard to the house at 38 Oxley Road. They "felt threatened by Lee Hsien Loong's misuse of his position and influence over the Singapore government and its agencies to drive his personal agenda". They alleged that their brother thwarted the will of their father in order to use the house as a monument to milk his father's legacy. They also criticised the influence of Ho Ching over the government, and alleged that the Prime Minister harboured political ambitions for his son, Li Hongyi. A special parliamentary session was held to clear the Prime Minister of any wrongdoings and the siblings agreed to keep the dispute private after the session.

Publications
 "Lee Wei Ling - A Hakka Woman's Singapore" (2015).

References

External links

1955 births
Living people
Lee family (Singapore)
National University of Singapore alumni
Singaporean neurologists
Singaporean people of Hakka descent